Sefid Cheshmeh (also Romanized as Sefīd Cheshmeh) is a village in Daland Rural District, in the Central District of Ramian County, Golestan Province, Iran. At the 2006 census, its population was 489, in 115 families.

References 

Populated places in Ramian County